Viliami Manuopangai Faka’osiula Hingano (1975 – 10 June 2022) was a Tongan politician and Cabinet Minister.

Biography
Hingano ran in the 2010 Tongan general election but was unsuccessful. He was elected to the Legislative Assembly of Tonga at the 2014 election, but his election was disputed, leading to a recount, which he won. In parliament, he generally sided with the Noble faction, opposing the government of ʻAkilisi Pōhiva's decision to withdraw from hosting the Pacific Games, and opposing it in confidence votes. In June 2016 he advocated for higher salaries for MPs.

Hingano was defeated at the 2017 election, losing to Moʻale Finau. In January 2021 he was appointed Governor of Haʻapai by Prime Minister Pōhiva Tuʻiʻonetoa. Shortly after being appointed he was convicted of unlawful possession of 198kg of turtle meat. He was fined T$12,000, but allowed to retain his position.

He was re-elected to the Legislative Assembly at the 2021 election. On 28 December 2021 he was appointed to the Cabinet of Siaosi Sovaleni as Minister for Agriculture, Food and Forests. Immediately after being appointed he flew to New Zealand for medical treatment. 

Hingano died in Auckland on 10 June 2022 at the age of 47.

References

1970s births
2022 deaths
Government ministers of Tonga
Governors of Haʻapai
Independent politicians in Tonga
Members of the Legislative Assembly of Tonga
Year of birth missing